The House of Shame (Italian: La casa del peccato) is a 1938 Italian "white-telephones" comedy film directed by Max Neufeld and starring Amedeo Nazzari, Assia Noris and Alida Valli.

It was shot at the Cinecittà Studios in Rome. The film's sets were designed by the art director Gastone Medin. The film was the first time Nazzari and Valli co-starred together, as they would later go on to do a number of films.

Synopsis
A wife, concerned that her husband does not love her, pretends to have another suitor in order to make him jealous. Getting wise to this, he in turn pretends to have a new girlfriend.

Cast
 Amedeo Nazzari as Giulio 
 Assia Noris as Renata 
 Umberto Melnati as Massimo 
 Alida Valli as La ragazza 
 Giulio Stival as Un amico di Giulio 
 Giuseppe Porelli as Il maggiordomo 
 Aristide Baghetti
 Giuseppe Bordonaro
 Vasco Creti
 Corrado De Cenzo
 Jone Morino
 Tatiana Pavoni
 Teodoro Pescara Pateras
 Giuseppe Pierozzi
 Sandra Ravel

References

Bibliography
 Nowell-Smith, Geoffrey & Hay, James & Volpi, Gianni. The Companion to Italian Cinema. Cassell, 1996.

External links 

1938 films
Italian comedy films
1938 comedy films
1930s Italian-language films
Films directed by Max Neufeld
Italian black-and-white films
Films shot at Cinecittà Studios
1930s Italian films